The Flotsam Moraines are the moraines trailing northeastward from Mount Morrison, trapped in the ice eddies between Midship Glacier and ice from local mountainside glaciers, in the Prince Albert Mountains of Victoria Land, Antarctica. They were so named by a 1989–90 New Zealand Antarctic Research Program field party from association with Jetsam Moraine and because all supraglacial moraines are "floating" on the glacier ice, and drift in a manner similar to marine flotsam and jetsam.

References 

Moraines of the Ross Dependency
Landforms of Victoria Land
Scott Coast